Kiki: Ten Thousand Years in a Lifetime is the autobiography of Albert Maori Kiki, a Papua New Guinea pathologist and politician.

The book, first published in 1968, describes the author's childhood as a member of a semi-nomadic tribe, with vivid descriptions of rituals and customs. It recounts his first contact with western civilisation, his further education, and his political awakening.

According to the preface, the book was dictated onto a tape recorder, and was later transcribed and edited by Ulli Beier.

The book was reviewed by L. L. Langness in American Anthropologist (Volume 72, Issue 6), where he describes it as "an account well worth reading whether you specialise in New Guinea, the Pacific, or in some other area of the world."

Contents

Preface
 Growing up in Papua
 Orokolo
 Initiation
 Entering the White Man's World
 Fiji
 Fighting Years
 The Buka Affair
 Growing Tensions
 Pangu Pati
 Elections

References

Papua New Guinean literature
1968 non-fiction books
Political autobiographies